The Oboe Concerto is a concerto for solo oboe and orchestra by the American composer Elliott Carter.  The work was commissioned by the conductor Paul Sacher for the oboist Heinz Holliger.  It was first performed in Zürich, June 17, 1988, by Heinz Holliger and the Collegium Musicum Zürich under the conductor John Carewe.

Composition
The Oboe Concerto has a duration of roughly 25 minutes is composed in one continuous movement.

Instrumentation
The concerto is scored for solo oboe and a small orchestra divided into two groups.  The concertino group consists of the oboe, violas, and a percussionist.  The larger group comprises flute (doubling piccolo, alto flute), clarinet (doubling bass clarinet), horn, trombone, one additional percussionist, and strings (violins I & II, violoncellos, and double basses).

Reception
Conductor David Robertson said of the work:
Alan Rich of Entertainment Weekly was more critical of the piece, saying, "Where is the passion in this music, the secret messages from composer to hearer that tell us why idea number two is the logical outgrowth of idea number one? This is music that lends itself to exhilarating performances (as here), with little to justify it all taking place."

References

Concertos by Elliott Carter
1987 compositions
Carter, Elliott
Music commissioned by Paul Sacher